The Valea Șesii or Valea Șesei is a right tributary of the river Arieș in Romania. It flows into the Arieș near Baia de Arieș. The Valea Șesii dam is built on this river.

References

Rivers of Romania
Rivers of Alba County